Robert Lee Saunders (January 6, 1902 - February 12, 1983) was a professional baseball pitcher in the Negro leagues. He played with the Kansas City Monarchs and the Detroit Stars in 1926. In some sources, his career is combined with that of Augustus Saunders.

References

External links
 and Seamheads

Detroit Stars players
Kansas City Monarchs players
1902 births
1983 deaths
Baseball pitchers
Baseball players from Washington (state)
20th-century African-American sportspeople